Daniel A. Levinson (born July 8, 1965 in Los Angeles, California) is an American jazz clarinetist, saxophonist, and bandleader.  He is best known for his mastery of the jazz styles of the 1910s, 1920s, and 1930s.

Levinson has been a member of the bands of Leon Redbone and Vince Giordano in addition to leading multiple bands of his own, mostly in the New York City area.

Discography

As sideman
 2017: The Unheard Artie Shaw (Hep)

References

External links

 DanLevinson.com
 All About Jazz biography

Dixieland revivalist clarinetists
Dixieland revivalist saxophonists
Dixieland revivalist bandleaders
Living people
1965 births
21st-century saxophonists
21st-century clarinetists
American jazz saxophonists